Kansas City Union Station (station code: KCY) is a union station opened in 1914, serving Kansas City, Missouri, and the surrounding metropolitan area. It replaced a small Union Depot from 1878. Union Station served a peak annual traffic of more than 670,000 passengers in 1945 at the end of World War II, quickly declined in the 1950s, and was closed in 1985.

In 1996, a public–private partnership undertook Union Station's $250 million restoration, funded in part by a sales tax levied in both Kansas and Missouri counties in the Kansas City metropolitan area. By 1999, the station reopened as a series of museums and other public attractions. In 2002, Union Station saw its return as a train station when Amtrak began providing public transportation services and has since become Missouri's second-busiest train station. The refurbished station boasts theaters, ongoing museum exhibits, and attractions such as the Science City at Union Station, the Irish Museum and Cultural Center, and the Todd Bolender Center for Dance and Creativity. Since 2016, it is also a stop on the KC Streetcar.

History

Union Depot
On April 8, 1878, Union Depot opened on a narrow triangle of land in Kansas City between Union Avenue and the railroad tracks of the Hannibal and St. Joseph Railroad in present-day West Bottoms. Nicknamed the "Jackson County Insane Asylum" by those who thought it was too large, it was the second union station in the country, after the one in Indianapolis. The new depot was a hybrid of the Second Empire style and Gothic Revival. By the start of the 20th century, over 180 trains were passing daily through the station, serving a city whose population had tripled during its first-quarter century of operation. In 1903, the lack of room for expansion and a major flood led the city and the railroads to decide a new station was required.

New location
The decision to build a new station was spearheaded by the Kansas City Terminal Railway, a switching and terminal railroad that was a joint operation of the following railroad lines:

 Alton Railroad
 Atchison, Topeka and Santa Fe Railway
 Chicago, Burlington and Quincy Railroad
 Chicago Great Western Railway
 Chicago, Milwaukee, St. Paul and Pacific Railroad
 Chicago, Rock Island and Pacific Railroad
 Kansas City Southern Railway
 Missouri-Kansas-Texas Railroad
 Missouri Pacific Railroad
 St. Louis-San Francisco Railway
 Union Pacific Railroad
 Wabash Railroad

The new location was chosen to be a valley at 25th Street and Grand Avenue used by the Kansas City Belt Railway. It was south of the central business district, above and away from the floodplain.

The architect chosen to design the Union Station building was Jarvis Hunt, a proponent of the City Beautiful movement. The design was a main hall for ticketing, and a perpendicular hall extending out over the tracks for passenger waiting. The Beaux-Arts station opened on October 30, 1914, as the third-largest train station in the country. Due to its central location, Kansas City was a hub for both passenger and freight rail traffic. The scale of the building reflected this status.

Union Station made headlines on June 17, 1933, as four lawmen were gunned down by gang members attempting to free captured fugitive Frank Nash. Nash was also killed in the gun battle. The Kansas City Massacre highlighted the lawlessness of Kansas City under the Pendergast Machine and resulted in the arming of all FBI agents.

In 1945, annual passenger traffic peaked at 678,363. As train travel declined beginning in the 1950s, the city had less and less need for a large train station. By 1973, only 32,842 passengers passed through the facility, all passenger train service was now run by Amtrak, and the building was beginning to deteriorate. The city government of Kansas City wished to preserve and redevelop the building. To facilitate this, in 1974, they made a development deal with Trizec Corporation, a Canadian redevelopment firm. Included in the deal was an agreement that Trizec would redevelop the station. Between 1979 and 1986, Trizec constructed two office buildings on surrounding property, but did not redevelop the station. In 1985, Amtrak moved all passenger operations to a smaller "Amshack" facility adjacent to the old station. By this time, the station was essentially closed. In 1988, the city filed suit against Trizec for the failure to develop the station; the case was settled in 1994. For most of this time period, the building continued to decay.

Renovation
In 1996, residents in five counties throughout the metropolitan area in both Kansas and Missouri approved the so-called "bistate tax", a 1/8 of a cent sales tax, part of which helped to fund just under half of the $250 million restoration of Union Station. Renovation began in 1997 and was completed in 1999. The remaining money was raised through private donations and federal funding. The renovations enabled Amtrak to move its operations back inside the main building in 2002.

Today, Union Station receives no public funding. Current operating costs are funded by general admission and theater ticketing, grants, corporate and private donations, commercial space leases and facility rental. Union Station Kansas City, Inc. is a nonprofit 501(c)(3) organization which manages Union Station and which previously managed the Kansas City Museum. Union Station is now home to Science City (opened in 1999), a family-friendly interactive science center with more than 50 hands-on exhibits; the H&R Block City Stage Theater, a live-action venue with productions for all ages; the Regnier Extreme Screen, the largest 3-D movie screen in the region at five and half stories tall; two restaurants, including Pierponts, an upscale steak and seafood restaurant, and the Harvey's at Union Station; shops, including Rocky Mountain Chocolate, The Science City Store, The Kansas City Store opening in 2011 and Parisi Coffee; the Gottlieb Planetarium, the largest planetarium in the area; and various temporary museum exhibits including the internationally acclaimed Dead Sea Scrolls in 2007, Bodies Revealed in 2008, Dialog in the Dark in 2009, Dinosaurs Unearthed in 2010 and Diana, A Celebration focusing upon Princess Diana in 2011. The Irish Museum and Cultural Center has been located in the station since March 17, 2007.

The old Union Station Powerhouse building has been renovated by the Kansas City Ballet. It is the ballet's new home and is known as the Todd Bolender Center for Dance and Creativity since August 2011.
 
In April 2015 and again in 2017, the reality TV show American Ninja Warrior was filmed at Union Station.

The 2023 NFL Draft is scheduled to be held in front of and partially inside of Union Station in April 2023.

Building
The Beaux-Arts building consists of a Grand Hall with three large hanging chandeliers and ornate ceiling work, and the Grand Plaza, or North Waiting Room. A large clock hanging from the central arch divides the two sections of the building.

Amtrak service
The station is served by four trains per day:
 The Missouri River Runner, round trip to St. Louis 
 The Southwest Chief, departing for Chicago in the morning and for Los Angeles late evening

Of the twelve Missouri stations served by Amtrak, Kansas City was the second busiest in the 2015 fiscal year, boarding or disembarking an average  421 passengers daily.

Historical image gallery

See also

 List of Amtrak stations
 Pencoyd Railroad Bridge (Kansas City, Missouri)

References

External links

 

 360KC.com, Union Station, 360° visual Internet tours

1914 establishments in Missouri
Kansas City
Kansas City, Missouri
Downtown Kansas City
Kansas City, Missouri
Kansas City, Missouri
Kansas City, Missouri
Kansas City, Missouri
Kansas City, Missouri
Former Kansas City Southern Railway stations
Former Missouri–Kansas–Texas Railroad stations
Kansas City, Missouri
Former St. Louis–San Francisco Railway stations
Kansas City, Missouri
National Register of Historic Places in Kansas City, Missouri
Passenger rail transportation in Kansas
Railway stations in the United States opened in 1914
Railway stations on the National Register of Historic Places in Missouri
Tourist attractions in Kansas City, Missouri
Transit centers in the United States
Transportation buildings and structures in Kansas City, Missouri
Kansas City, Missouri
Union stations in the United States